Aliza Olmert (née Richter; born 1946) is an Israeli artist, photographer, author and social worker. She is married to former Israeli Prime Minister Ehud Olmert.

Biography 

Aliza Olmert was born in a displaced persons camp in Eschwege, Germany. Her parents were Holocaust survivors from Łódź, Poland. She immigrated to Israel with her family in 1949, grew up in Ramat Gan, and served as an instructor in the Israel Defense Forces. She met her husband, Ehud Olmert, at the Hebrew University of Jerusalem, where she was studying social work. The Olmerts live in Jerusalem's Katamon neighborhood. They have five children (including Dana and Shaul Olmert), one of them adopted.

Art career 
In 1985–1988, at the age of 40, Olmert studied environmental design at the Bezalel Academy of Art and Design. In Israel, Olmert has exhibited at the Museum on the Seam in Jerusalem, the Museum of Israeli Art in Ramat Gan, the Eretz Israel Museum in Tel Aviv and the Tel Aviv Artists' House. Her work has also been exhibited in Japan, Uruguay, Italy, Britain, Poland, Argentina and New York. In March 2008, she was awarded the Steiger Prize in Germany.

Politics
Olmert's politics are left-wing, and she, their children and her social circle have been accused of influencing her husband's political views. She is said to support Meretz.

Olmert dislikes the political limelight, and says that their most difficult period as a couple was 1993–2003, when Ehud was mayor of Jerusalem.

Social welfare 
Olmert is active in social programs promoting child welfare. She is the chairman of Or Shalom and Tlalim, which aid children at risk and families with homebound sick children. Olmert is also a member of the Action Committee for Children of Foreign Workers and President of the Board of Unitaf,  a community-based organization that creates early-childhood programs for refugee and stateless children living in Israel.

Published works 
 Wall Language (co-authored with Gayil Hareven)
 Fantasy for Piano (a play performed by the Cameri Theater)

References

External links 
 
 Aliza Olmert Bio on pmo.gov.il
 Aliza Olmert – Dead End – Exhibition
 Aliza Olmert – Israel – Exhibition
 
 
 

1946 births
Living people
20th-century Israeli women artists
21st-century Israeli women artists
Bezalel Academy of Arts and Design alumni
Polish emigrants to Israel
Israeli Jews
Israeli people of Polish-Jewish descent
Israeli social workers
Israeli women writers
Jewish artists
Jewish women writers
People from Eschwege
Jews in Mandatory Palestine
Spouses of prime ministers of Israel
Paul Baerwald School of Social Work and Social Welfare alumni
Aliza
Jewish women artists